Nick Theodorakopoulos (born 29 June 1964) is an Australian football (soccer) coach.

Managerial career
Theodorakopoulos previously coached in the predecessor to the A-League, the NSL with the now-defunct Parramatta Power.

His last coaching role was with the Newcastle United Jets in the A-League. He had promised to deliver better football and passing game than previous coach Richard Money. However, In October 2006 after recording no wins during the Pre-Season Cup and during the first seven rounds of A-League matches, Theodorakopoulos became the first coach to be dismissed in the club's A-League's history. His assistant Gary Van Egmond was instated as the caretaker coach. On 2 April 2009, was named as the new head coach of his former club Sydney Olympic FC, he follow up of Aytek Genc and was on 5 October 2009 released.

TV career
During the 2006 FIFA World Cup he was a TV analyst for SBS's coverage.

Personal life

Managerial statistics

References

External links
 Oz Football profile
 South Coast Football Profile

Australian soccer coaches
Australian people of Greek descent
Newcastle Jets FC managers
Living people
1964 births
Sydney Olympic FC managers
A-League Men managers
Australian soccer players
Association footballers not categorized by position
People from Bathurst, New South Wales
Sportsmen from New South Wales